Turaga na Rasau is a traditional Fijian chiefly title of the Lau Islands.
Prior to Fiji's colonial days, Fiji had many different Vanua with their own Paramount Chieftain which exercised no authority over the other; a saying from the island of Kadavu aptly summarises it "Nomu Turaga o sega na noqu Turaga" or "Your Chief is not my Chief" also the people of Beqa Island were of a similar opinion saying "Qali Cuva Ki Lagi" or "Subject only to heaven"  and would bow to no outside Chieftain, but at the turn of the 20th century aspects of the traditional social structure remained, but for administrative purposes three main Matanitu were solidified and formed as they were the dominant consolidated powers at the time being that of Kubuna, Burebasaga and Tovata.
With regard to the Rasau while its traditional origins were in Kubuna on Bau the titles traditional authority in modern Fiji is now in Tovata, Lau in particular Lomaloma Tikina on the Island of Vanua Balavu.

The title 
Fijian regional and inter-regional chiefly titles vary in name and history and each tribal unit will have its own unique title with its history, mythology and Folklore and as tribes interacted in trade or in war, their unique stories and histories became intertwined, there is evidence of this across the Fiji island Group and also with Fiji's closest Pacific neighbor and sometimes friendly foe Tonga, the following section of this article covers that of the Turaga Na Rasau as far as its traditional jurisdiction, translation, composition and location.

Composition and location
1a. The Turaga Na Rasau is the Chieftain of Lomaloma Tikina and the Turaga I Taukei for Yavusa Buca as per NLTB records from 1895 to date. there are two other dominate Yavusa, that being Yavusa Qala and Yavusa Naturuku with their Chieftain being Ravunisa and Tui Naturuku and are fiercely independent.

The Ravunisa and the Rasau have a connected history and have led the Tikina at different times, the Ravunisa is the traditional leader of Lomaloma koro.
The Rasau is still reluctantly viewed as the Chieftain for Lomaloma Tikina and the villages that are situated in this area and this is still recognised in NLTB records. 

The Yavusa Toga of Sawana village are an exception as they are the direct descendants of Enele Ma'afu and his conquests and are independent of the Rasau. Past title holders of the Rasau title have had ties via intermarriages to both Yavusa Toga and Yavusa Buca but have not led both.

Future decisions of the Rasau's authority will have to be decided and passed through provincial and tikina meetings and documented with NLTB records. As the records stand the Rasau is currently the Chieftain for Lomaloma Tikina and Lomaloma koro and the Yavusa and Matagali that fall within this domain. Lomaloma Tikina comprises 10 villages and they are as follows: Lomaloma (Nakoro), Sawana, Susui, Narocivo, Namalata, Uruone, Levukana, Dakuilomaloma, and Tuvuca. These villages are located on the island of Vanua Balavu except for Tuvuca, which lies between Vanua Balavu and Lakeba and near the Island of Nayau, all of which are located in the Lau group of islands, which form part of the island nation of Fiji.

The title
1b. Ratu Keni Waqalekaleka Ugadregadrega Naulumatua II is most senior in line for the title although the traditional installation has not taken place. Ratu Keni is the head Chief or the Turaga I Taukei of the Yavusa (tribe) Vusaratu Vuaniivi Buca, Mataqali (clan) Vusaratu Vuaniivi Buca, and Tokatoka (family unit) Valelevu. According to Ratu Keni II the title Rasau is a short form for Ratu Ni Vanua, Sau Ni Vanua roughly translated to Chief of the land or representation embodying all that is the people and their ways and their ancestor gods. In a direct transliteration, Ra is a prefix in many titles (Ramasi, Ramalo, Ratu) and Sau is simply 'Chief' it also has the same meaning in Rotuma and Tonga (Hau).

The Turaga na Rasau in Native land and Fisheries recorded documents is part of the Tokatoka Valelevu, Matagali Buca and Yavusa Buca and heads the Tikina of Lomaloma, the addition of Vusaratu and Vuaniivi in the clan and tribe names was added on request of the Turaga I Taukei and the Tokatoka Valelevu in remembrance of the chiefly ancestors of the Tokatoka Valelevu of the Turaga na Rasau.

Origin on the mainland 

Please note that in the following part of this article especially points 2a, 2aa and 2aaa, diverges on topic to some historical points and explanations of time, places, people, names, mythology and folklore this is to create an overall understanding of the Rasau Title and its origins.

Nakauvadra to Bau
2b. Kubuna is known as a confederacy or Matanitu in Fiji but in pre-colonial times Kubuna was a place name with that in mind, as recorded in Bauan pre colonial history, It was at Kubuna that the great ancestral Chief, Ratu Vueti Koroi-Ratu mai Bulu, Serui-Ratu mai Bulu, the first Roko Tui Bau Vuani-ivi, (according to legend he was the fourth (4) generation from Ratu Lutunasobasoba) who established the Kingdom of Kubuna, and formed one of the earliest known Fijian settlements after hostilities ceased the people of Nakauvadra and the victorious Bauan army upon leaving the Mountains and finding their way to the sea made a Cairn named Ulunivuaka and later called it Bau in honour of Ratu Vueti and his achievements.(it was named after a shrine in the Nakauvadra hill range in the province of Ra)  He took the titles of Roko Tui Bau Vuani-ivi and Koroi Ratu Maibulu. After his death, he was buried in Kubuna in a throne called Tabukasivi, and was deified and became the ancestral god of the people of Kubuna, they worshiped him in the form of a serpent.

After his death a division arose between Bucaira and Vunibuca over the installation of a successor to Ratu Vueti. Other clans went to Namuka and wandered from place to place. Eventually a new Roko Tui Bau, Ratu Serumataidrau, was selected from the Vuaniivi, a Tokatoka Valelevu of the Mataqali and the Yavusa Ratu Vuani-ivi Buca clan, which had settled at Namuka.

The reign of Naulivou 

The following section outlines the continuation of a journey and the battle of two Chieftain and their tribes the losing senior Chief then settles in the far flung Lau Islands while his subordinate then seizes power, this is to show the early history of the Rasau.

Naulivou and Raiwalui

3a. Naulivou was installed circa 1804 as the Vunivalu (in modern Fiji this is now the highest chiefly title in the Kingdom of Kubuna, but was not so in Fiji's early history) after the death of his father Banuve who had three sons Naulivou, Tanoa II and Celua. Ratu Raiwalui of the Roko Tui Bau Vuaniivi Clan, Yavusa-Ratu, became the sixth Roko Tui Bau Vuani-Ivi which was the highest chiefly title in the greater area of Kubuna and the second Roko Tui Bau Vuani-Ivi that occupied the Island Delainakorolevu or Ulunivuaka, which was then called Bau in 1760 which was named by the fifth Roko Tui Bau Vuani-ivi Ratu Lele who was then buried at Delai Daku the hilly range of Viwa Island. But the relationship between these two men was not a happy one. When they came into conflict, the Vuaniivi clan fled to Kubuna and sought the protection of Titokobitu, the Chief of Namara. Together with some other chiefs of Namara, they reached Koro and from there went to Vuna, on the island of Taveuni, and thence to Vanuabalavu. The Namara people who later joined their early travellers now of Levukana village on Lomaloma, were left behind at Vuna and they fled to the mountains lest the Bauans should pursue them. The Vuaniivi warriors left some of their war canoes high and dry on the beach at Vuna when they set off for Vanuabalavu.

Wars and betrayals
3b.(1808–1809) When Naulivou heard that they were at Vanuabalavu, he sent his brother Tanoa to pursue and punish them by using firearms, and this was the third campaign in which firearms were used in Fijian battle. Charlie Savage who had been wrecked in the Eliza showed the Vunivalu how to use "guns" and it was these new weapons that assisted the Vunivalu to subdue all things he wanted. Tanoa with his men and Ratu Raiwalui with his followers unexpectedly met at sea not far from Mago Island and a battle royale ensued in which the Vuaniivi lost about a hundred men, including their chief Ratu Raiwalui, the Roko Tui Bau Vuani-ivi, the first "Ra-Sau" of Delainakorolevu Lomaloma. His body was then taken to Lomaloma for burial at Matanituvu. Those who escaped took refuge with the Namara people at Vuna. On returning to Bau, Tanoa stopped at Vuna and captured an enemy town, Vuloci. They put up little resistance eventually surrendering and as a peace offering, presented a woman of chiefly rank, Adi Sugavanua of the Vuaniivi, Vusaratu clan, who was taken to Bau and became the wife of Naulivou. Tanoa on seeing the Vuaniivi war canoes on the beach at Vuna, set fire to them and secured for himself the name Tanoa Visawaqa, or Tanoa "The burner of boats".

Tanoa went to Vanuabalavu once again hiding in an Island called Yanuca at Raviravi in the bay of Lomaloma and so the Vuani-ivi entering the Namalata passage once again engaged him in battle in which the Vuani-ivi lost again over hundred men in Lomaloma bay and all their bodies were taken to Navavaoa at Lomaloma for burial. The Vuani-ivi clan went back to Bau and left the Yavusa Vueti, Navusaqa, Naturuku, Kavika, Yaro, and Radave to occupy the hilly village Delainakorolevu, which was the mountain village at Lomaloma. On Reaching Bau the warfare intensified during the time of Tanoa, which eventually led to his exile, firstly at Koro Island, and thence to Somosomo in Taveuni where he remained for-years until his son Seru who was allowed to live in Bau during his fathers exile, gained power by subverting the Lasakau people to plot and execute an overthrow of the Roko Tui Bau Vuani-ivi clan led by Ratu Ravulo Vakayaliyalo In 1837 and reinstated his father as the ruling Vunivalu ni Bau. It was then that Seru was given the name "Centipede" in Fijian called "Cikinovu" because ‘he moved silently and struck painfully’ and later he was called Cakobau or ‘destroyer of Bau’, in subverting the Lasakau people to plot and execute a "Coup". The title Vunivalu was originally the Roko Tui Bau Vuani-ivi second in command and Minister of war, Vu-ni-valu in a direct transliteration means "Lord of War".

What came to pass
3c. The Roko Tui Bau Vuani-ivi clan, Ratu Ravulo Vakayaliyalo, Ratu Waqatabu Matawaqa and Ratu Niumataiwalu Kinita, the sons of Ratu Raiwalui the Roko Tui Bau Vuani-ivi went back to Vanuabalavu at Delainakorolevu, Lomaloma and there followed the Lasakauan, they were left at the island Laucala near Taveuni and the rest are at Levukana a village in Lomaloma Tikina on the Island of Vanuabalavu and still live there to this very day.

The Vunivalu's tenacity and actions however they are judged paid off. Naulivou and Tanoa secured supremacy of Bau and their growing strength brought many victories across Fiji which brought the Island Nation into a new era of History which eventually saw a reluctantly united Fijian Nation under the rule of Ratu Seru Cakobau, the Rasau and his people remained in Lomaloma and their descendents live there to date.

Rasau of recent history 

Note: These are the names documented not long after cession in 1874 to the United Kingdom, it was then that titles, title holders and their lineage were documented and held in government records these records came to be known as "Ai Vola ni Kawa Bula" now maintained under the Native lands and Fisheries Commission.

Chart 4

A detailed lineage of the Turaga Na Rasau 

Please note: this lineage numbers in order of descendants and its progression from Roko Tui Bau Vuaniivi into the Rasau. Included in the chart are their names, whom they married, their place of origin, where they travelled, and some brief points of their history if known. These are in Fijian with English translation in brackets, although some parts are just in English. The number sequence starts again when the title Turaga Rasau begins its use, and  also when a younger line takes over after the older line became extinct.

Chart 5a

Chart 5a-6

Chart 5b

The continuation of the title 

After the death of Ratu Keni Naulumatua II, his title will return to the eldest line of the patrilineal lineage, which will be Ratu Viliame Fonolahi's children Ratu Clifton Keni Fonolahi Naulumatua, Ratu Edger Keni, and Ratu Ivan Keni. It is possible for the title to descend through a junior lineage or through the maternal lineage, but such a decision would have to be approved by Tikina elders, the chiefly family members of Tokatoka Valelevu of the Matagali and Yavusa Buca, because the position is held for life.

A notable chieftain of the Rasau 

Notability is a position of exalted widely recognized importance, as recorded history in Fiji is limited, there may have been many that would have been notable men or women and likewise there would have been many Chieftain of the line of the Rasau that were worthy of notice Like Ratu Raiwalui, Ratu Poasa Vakadewavanua and Ratu Jese Waqalekaleka to name but a few and the documents to allow for great detail on these individuals are few and far between or unobtainable, however Rasau of more recent history seem to have had anthropological articles written on them or contributed to anthropological research in the early part of the 20th century and were documented and are held in record and their stories can be shared, the most well documented life of the Rasau of Recent history was of Ratu Keni Naulumatua he contributed to works by anthropologists Arthur Maurice Hocart in his books "Lau Islands" and "Fijian Heralds and Envoys" as well as Mr Alex Phillip Lessin in his book "Village of conquerors" and participated quite actively in the early days when Fiji was a young colony.

Ratu Keni Naulumatua

7-1a. Ratu Keni Naulumatua (1895–1972) was a Fijian chief who held the title of Turaga Na Rasau he inherited this title after the death of his father who held the title before him for more than 70 years, Ratu Keni reigned for 32 years from 1944 to 1972. He was the firstborn son of Ratu Jese Waqalekaleka who was the eldest son of the Tui Daku Ratu Waquila Vakavo, Ratu Keni was the third eldest child but the eldest son. His last name, broken down, is as follows: ‘Na’ is a joining word in this case like 'the'; 'ulu' means 'head'; 'Matua' is like 'wise’ or ‘learned’. It roughly translates as ‘the wise man’. Its more correct intended meaning is "first born".

7-1b. Ratu Keni was the 11th Turaga Na Rasau and his line traces back more than 10 generations of Rasau, but for only 9 generations was the title Tui Tuvuca also included in the Rasau Title, but they are two quite separate titles. Tuvuca is part of the Tikina of Lomaloma and the chiefly title of this island is held by the Tui Tuvuca, which is generally held in personal union by the reigning Turaga na Rasau.
The Village Chief of Tuvuca holds the title of Ramasi, it was this chiefs ancestors who gave the title to the Rasau of Lomaloma because he brought peace to Tuvuca and stopped a long-standing feud.
Ratu Keni was married twice and had many children. His first marriage was to a woman of Tongan nobility from the Village of Sawana, her name was Adi Mere Tuisalalo of the Yavusa Toga, Tokatoka Togalevu., with whom he had six children Adi Josivini Vana Tukana, Ratu Viliame Fonolahi and the twins Adi Tupou Moheofo and Adi Mereani Louakau, Ratu Jese Waqalekaleka, and Adi Mere Tuisalalo. Then with his second wife, Adi Sera Qolisaya of Daliconi Village, he had 3 sons, Ratu Viliame Tuiqilaqila Serunadibi, Ratu Keni Ugadregadrega, and Ratu Tanoa Senibua.

Symbols of a royal household

7-2a. Each Yavusa, Matagali and Tokatoka in Fiji identifies itself by a name and also by identification with certain plants and animals, A possible correlation would be totems or even a Coat of arms if they so wish to make it a visual emblem, which have a different historical significance to each family unit or tribe.

7-2b. Every tribe belongs to a specific structure within a Vanua, while Vanua not only refers to land area it also embodies beliefs, common ancestors and spiritual connections, but in this case could be simplified to translate as a small kingdom, in the Vanua of Lomaloma which is part of the greater Kingdom or Yasana of Lau of which the following defines Ratu Keni's tribe and family unit to whom he belongs, traditionally speaking across Vanuabalavu they only have Yavusa and Matagali no Tokatoka the exception being with the Vanua of Lomaloma:

Yavusa (Greater tribe)(Vusaratu Vuaniivi) Buca, Mataqali (smaller tribal unit within the Yavusa or clan)(Vusaratu Vuaniivi) Buca, Tokatoka (family unit within clan), Valelevu (translated means big house).

7-2c. The following is the specific totems or coat of arms for Ratu Keni Naulumatua of Tokatoka Valelevu:

Vua-ni-Kau (fruit of the tree) 		Ivi (Tahitian Chestnut) /

Manumanu (animal)			Koli (Dog)/

Ika (Fish) 				Saqa Leka (Giant Trevally - caranx ignobilis)) /

Salusalu (floral garland) 		Bua Ni Viti (Fagraea berteriana) /

Tutuvakavanua (Elders of the kingdom)	Turaga (his position/place in the Kingdom).

Points of interest

7-3. Ratu Keni served with The Fiji Labour Detachment in France in the First World War and was a decorated soldier; his good friend who won the French medal of honour was Ratu Sir Lala Sukuna At the end of the war they toured Europe playing the steel guitar and singing in cafes before returning home to help build their nation. Ratu Sukuna went on to become known as the modern founding father of the Fiji Islands and Fiji's first Lawyer, while Ratu Keni served 40 years in the civil service some of that time was also spent in Dunedin, New Zealand in a working capacity representing Fiji, he died at age 77 and was buried in Suva.

A strategic marriage

7-4a. The term Vasu in Fiji refers to an individuals maternal ties to a village, Matagali etc. If a child is of a woman of rank he/she is a Vasu Levu to that particular area, if both mother and father are Fijian he/she is a Vasu I Taukei, if both mother and Father are Fijian and both are of a very senior chiefly rank from respective areas then the child's Vasu connection is referred to as Turaga na Vasu. Intermarriage and the Vasu was used to expand kingdoms, unite old enemies or strengthen chiefly family links.

Details of Ratu Keni Naulumatua's first wife Mere Tuisalalo and her family are as follows: The mother of Mere Tuisalalo was Setaita Miller; the father of Mere Tuisalalo was Viliame Fonolahi from Kologa in Tonga. Viliame Fonolahi was a devout Christian and was rumoured to have baptized the former Tui Vuda (a prominent Ba chief) as a Christian. Setaita's mother was herself closely related to the Tongan Royal family.

7-4b. Mere Tuisalalo's older sister Lusiana Qolikoro had a relationship with Ratu Tevita Uluilakeba, Turaga Na Tui Nayau high Chieftain of the Island of Nayau and Lakeba in the Lau Archipelago, and their son was Ratu Sir Kamisese Kapaiwai Tuimacilai Mara, who served for decades as Prime Minister and President of Fiji.

7-4c. Mere Tuisalalo's younger sister Laisa Kaukiono had issue with the Turaga na Tui Kaba na Vunivalu Ratu Edward Tuivanuavou Tugi Cakobau (fondly known as Ratu Tui) and their child was Ratu Tui's eldest child and son Ratu Viliame Dreunimisimisi of Bau. The father of Ratu Sir Edward Tuivanuavou Tugi Cakobau (1908–1973) was the King of Tonga and his mother was Ratu Seru Epenisa Cakobau's granddaughter Adi Litia Cakobau.

Another wedding
7-5 Later in life Ratu Keni remarried and his second wife was Adi Sera Qolisaya of Daliconi Village from the tribe of the Tui Daku, a title Ratu Keni's grandfather Ratu Waquila Vakavo held.

The Installation of the Turaga na Rasau, Tui Tuvuca 

When a title holder of the Rasau dies, Yavusa Buca must choose a successor this will be chosen from the elder brothers, siblings or blood relations of Yavusa Buca, Tokatoka Valelevu.
Those from Dakuilomaloma hold council and only they the heralds (Matanivanua) attend to Ratify the decision, once the decision has been finalised the Ravunisa and his people of Yavusa Gala are informed and then The Ramasi of Tuvuca and his people.

In Lomaloma
The Rasau bears no title before the installation, of old Lomaloma the village was divided into two and there was only one chief being the Rasau. The whole village would attend the installation, the men of Daku would mix the Yaqona for the installation and on either side of the Tanoa was two men from Tuvuca (one is the Takala and the other the Matakilomaloma. ) and then a further two men of Daku would stand behind those mixing the Yaqona armed with a club, their role is to stand guard during the installation. Then before mixing the Torchmaster (Daunicina) of Dakuilomaloma then lights the flaming torches
Once the Yaqona is mixed the Heralds to the Rasau stands and shouts to the village “Hear me people of Lomaloma today is held the installation of the Sau, the Chief of us lomalomans, know well and obey him and extend to him all the chiefly customs”.

The ceremony
Once the Yaqona is mixed and the torchmasters (Daunicina) have held the flaming torches (the torches are held whether day or night ) up to the Yaqona as it pours from the bowl back into the Tanoa and the herald exclaims “Wai Donu” then the Takala and Matakilomaloma approach carefully the candidate being installed with 3 pieces of Masi (Bark cloth) and ask him to stand, they then tie the cloth one on the left and one on the right arm, then the herald stands and ties the third piece of masi on his right arm, once the arms are bound with masi both the herald and the Sau are seated. Then the Takala exclaims to the people “hear you men of lomaloma today is installed the Tui Tuvuca and the Sau of Lomaloma”, then to the Rasau he says “The Masi we are tying we tie for you to be Rasau and to love the people and to look after them well, so that no evil may come”. the Takala and the Matakilomaloma then sit down and clap once (Obo) and crawl back to the Tanoa (Yaqona basin where Yaqona is prepared and served from) the Kava is then brought to the Rasau and he drinks, once he has finished the two warriors of Tuvuca then approach the Rasau and stand behind him on either side and they speak the following words “This sir is your rampart, these clubs we two are carrying, be not faint hearted, we here are the men of Navusaveti, the name of the club we hold is called UPHOLD THE RASAU” they retire to their places and Kava is then poured for the Herald (matanivanua), then come the Naividrawalu who drink third because they are the nobles (taba Turaga) in Yavusa Buca and are the support for the Yaqona (I raviti ni Yaqona.) but they are never installed as Rasau. Then fourth the Turaga Na Ravunisa drinks and after him the rest drink.
The Daunicina (Torchmaster) then extinguishes the flaming torches after the Yaqona ceremony has finished.

Tui Tuvuca
After installation they all remain in Lomaloma for four nights, then the people of Dakuilomaloma and Tuvuca take the Rasau to Tuvuca, when he arrives in Tuvuca all the children are removed and there should be no crying or sound, for whoevers child cries it is that household who will prepare a feast as atonement for the breaking of the silence. The people of Tuvuca make feasts and the rest of the people carry flaming torches, after four nights of this the Rasau bathes in the sea and then the silence can be broken and the children can cry and the chopping of wood can also commence, the Rasau then returns to Lomaloma.

Recent history of the installation
There has not been a formal installation of the Turaga na Rasau since 1973 after the death of Ratu Keni Naulumatua and the installation of his brother Ratu Nelesoni Delailomaloma.
 The current most senior living candidates are firstly the sons of Ratu Viliame Fonolahi and his brothers (Ratu Jese, Ratu Viliame, Ratu Keni ansd Ratu Tanoa) children. Yavusa Buca and Tokatoka Valelevu have not yet met to choose a successor to the Title.

Tuilabelabe the Dog of War 

The Dog has been a spiritual representation for Yavusa Buca in particular tokatoka Valelevu from time immemorial the origins for this tradition are now forgotten.

In early records the Rasau was just referred to as Sau and the priest of spirits; if a battle was to be fought with Mualevu, the people of Buca and Lomaloma would bring him offerings of Tabua and as many as a hundred Tapa cloth this, Rasau at that time had a large dog referred to as Tuilabelabe or Tuinaividrawalu who would bark in the direction of the Army that would be defeated and based on this the people of Buca and the Lomalomans would decide to fight.

It is said until this present day that if anyone from Yavusa Buca is about to die the Dog Labelabe will appear as an omen of what will follow.

See also 
Lasakau sea warriors
Roko Tui Bau
Tanoa Visawaqa
Vunivalu of Bau
Seru Epenisa Cakobau
Turaga Na Ravunisa

Footnotes

References

2a, 2b, 3a, 3b

‘Matanitu’ the struggle for power in early Fiji by David Routledge 1985 – published by the Institute of Pacific studies and the University of the South Pacific Fiji – Chapter 2 Struggle between the Chiefs 1760–1842 Page 40 – 56
Tukutuku Raraba – History of Bau – Chapter 1 Page 1, National Archives Fiji, The Pacific Way – A Memoir – Ratu Sir Kamisese Mara – university of Hawaii press Honolulu, Reference to ‘Tukutuku Raraba’ as ‘registrar of land owners rights and customs’
Oceania A Journal Devoted to the Study of the Native Peoples of Australia, New Guinea, and the Islands of the Pacific Ocean, Volumes 12-13 By University of Sydney, Australian National Research Council - 1930, The battle of Lomaloma established Ratu Tanoa once and for all in the position of paramount chief; it also gave him complete control over the priestly clan.
Fiji's Heritage a history of Fiji by Kim Gravelle reprinted under its new name in 2000 it was originally published as Fiji Times a history of Fiji in 1979.	 Published by Tiara enterprises Nadi, Part 10 Page 44 – reference to Paper by Deve Toganivalu documenting Bauan pre-history and the superiority of the Roko Tui Bau as supreme Chief of Bau and the Vunivalu as his second.
The Fijians, Page 62, 1908, here’s a snippet: The Mikado and the Shogun are analogues of the Roko Tui and the Vunivalu.1 In Fiji, the process of scission was found in every stage of evolution.
The Golden Bough A Study in Magic and Religion: A New Abridgement from the Second and Third Editions - Page 149, by Sir James George Frazer - 1998.
Newspaper article, Title: The GCCs lost aura, By Robert Matau, Friday, February 23, 2007, Fiji Times...this discusses the rise of current Fijian institutions and also discusses Cakobau’s rise to power and his overthrow of the Roko Tui Bau.
The Kalou-Vu (Ancestor-Gods) of the Fijians, Basil H. Thomson, The Journal of the Anthropological Institute of Great Britain and Ireland, Vol. 24, 1895 (1895), pp. 340–359, details on Lutunasobasoba, Degei and other Kalou Vu of Fiji

1, 1a, 1b, 7

High Court civil action No.226 of 1999 - Ratu Viliame Fonolahi Keni Naulumatua vs NLTB, this reference is documented referring to a former Rasau with a very detailed account of the Rasau and its history and customary rights
Ai Tukutuku Kei Viti - By Rev. Epeli Rokowaqa (1929), National Archives of Fiji, a reprint was done in "Ai Tukutuku Vaka Lotu" April 1996, Methodist Church Fiji quarterly publication.
Neither Cargo Nor Cult: Ritual Politics and the Colonial Imagination in Fiji, By Martha Kaplan, page 25, Published by Duke University Press, reference to Matanitu and Yavusa and social structure.

1, 2, 3

Lau Islands, Fiji, By A.M Hocart and Bernice P. Bishop - Museum Bulletin 62 p226, Publication Date: June 1969, Publisher: Kraus Intl Pubns, Mr. Hocart gains much research off Ratu Keni Naulumatua The Rasau during that time.details of the Rasau and its history
Fijian Heralds and Envoys, A. M. Hocart, The Journal of the Royal Anthropological Institute of Great Britain and Ireland, Vol. 43, Jan.–Jun., 1913 (Jan.–Jun., 1913), pp. 109–118, A.M Hocart does a comparative study on two chiefs and their heralds and envoys one being the Rasau of Lomaloma,
The Cambridge History of the Pacific Islanders – Page 189 - 190, Reference showing that Naulivou used Charlie savage and mercenaries to carry out his bidding and solidifying his power as Vunivalu., By Malama Meleisea, Donald Denoon, Karen. L Nero, Jocylyn Linnekin, Stewart Firth.
Apologies to Thucydides: Understanding History as culture and Vice Versa – pages 27, 52, 63, 162, 198, 211, 216, 233, 249, By Marshal Sahlins Reference to the sanctity of the RokoTui Bau and also the battle near Vanuabalavu. Also the continued friction between the Roko Tui Bau and The Vunivalu. Also reference to the Masau as Matanivanua to the Roko Tui Bau and the Lasakau betrayal.

1a, 1c, 4,5b, 6

Ai Vola Ni Kawa, The information pertaining to the district of Lomaloma its tribes and families and leading title and its holders, Yavusa Buca, Tokatoka No.7 – Valelevu, Koro: Lomaloma, Tikina: Lomaloma, Yasana: Lau, Native Lands and Fisheries Commission – records as of July 19, 2005
Chart documented 1881, Native Registrar for Tikina of Lomaloma in the Vanua of Lau, Native Lands and Fisheries Commission and the Ai Vola Ni Kawa Bula: . This chart states in detail all the families and tribes of Lomaloma Tikina and the Leading Chieftain being the Turaga Rasau it refers two other Turaga I Taukei or Senior Chieftain being Ma’afu representing the Yavusa Toga in Sawana village and Joati Sugasuga representing the Turaga Ravunisa of Lomaloma village.

2aaa

Reference to origin of name ‘Fiji’ is found on Fiji Government Online.

3a

Fiji and the Fijians Volume 1, Page 19 – reference to Banuve succeeded by Naulivou and the Vunivalu title explained, also reference to term "Qali Cuva Ki Lagi"., By Thomas Williams, James Calvert
A History of Fiji by R.A. Derrick printed and published in the colony of Fiji at the Government press Suva – reprint 2001, Chapter 4 Page 54 and 55Reference to Banuve’ his line and succession by Naulivou also reference to Bau originally as Ulunivuaka, also reference to Savage arriving in 1808

3b

Tovata I & II BY AC Reid, printed in Fiji by Oceania printers Fiji, Part II Chapter 2 Page 82 Reference to the Rasau as the forbearer of Buca and originally from Bau, Part I Chapter 2 Page 40 Reference to Bucaira and Vunibuca installing a successor the chiefly descendents are just referred to now as Buca
Tukutuku Raraba – History of Bau – Chapter 1 Page 1, National Archives Fiji.
A History of Fiji by R.A. Derrick printed and published in the colony of Fiji at the Government press Suva – reprint 2001, Chapter 3 Page 43 and 44, Reference to Charlie Savages arrival 1808 on the Eliza and his importance to the Vunivalu -
Fiji's Heritage a history of Fiji by Kim Gravelle reprinted under its new name in 2000 it was originally published as Fiji Times a history of Fiji in 1979.	 Published by Tiara enterprises Nadi, Page 56 and 59 – reference to how Seru got his name Cakobau also reference to him as Cikinovu or centipede also reference to returning his father Tanoa from his exile.

2aa, 3c, 5a, 7-2c

This is a verbal account of Oral history passed down from parent to child over time, as was tradition
Reference to oral tradition:
Fiji (National) Museum Online, Archive Archaeology Newsletter, Oral traditions were passed on from our the older generation to the younger generation in years past, this occurred throughout the Pacific region, and it is an important aspect in Fijian family links to the clan, tribal land and myths and folklore….
‘The aspiring footballer who became a linguist’, Fiji Times, Sunday, June 10, 2007, Article on Paula Gerahty and reference to Burotukula
Oral Tradition for the Rasau and Yavusa Buca is collected from Turaga i Taukei of Yavusa Buca Ratu Keni Naulumatua, a tribes history is preserved through its elders and through its senior chief. also contributions and clarification from Ratu Tanoa Senibua and Ratu Ivan Keni both senior members of the Tokatoka Valelevu and candidates themselves for the title of Rasau. information recorded in May 2005 in Suva, Fiji.

6

Fijian Chiefs: A Recantation, A. M. Hocart, Man, Vol. 21, Jun., 1921 (Jun., 1921), pp. 85–86 - , Royal Anthropological Institute of Great Britain and Ireland, Reference to the passing on of Fijian chiefly titles and chiefly protocols in general.
The Role of a Fijian Chief, Clellan S. Ford, American Sociological Review, Vol. 3, No. 4 (Aug., 1938), pp. 541–550 - .

7-1a,7- 1b

Ai Vola Ni Kawa, Yavusa Buca, Tokatoka No.7 – Valelevu, Koro: Lomaloma, Tikina: Lomaloma, Yasana: Lau, Native Lands and Fisheries Commission – records as of July 19, 2005.

7-1a, 7-1b, 7- 3

News Paper Article, Title: "Retired and this time it’s for Good" – Mr Naulumatua [www.fijitimes.com/Fiji times]  Thursday, August 27, 1970, Page 6, Fiji Times Archives, This articles discusses Keni Naulumatua his 40 years in the civil service, his service in world war 1 in France, his time in New Zealand and his retirement.
Ratu Sukuna Soldier, Statesman, Man of two worlds, Chapter 7 page 52 –54, By Deryck Scarr, Reference to service in France with fellow countrymen.
Fijian Heralds and Envoys, By A. M. Hocart, The Journal of the Royal Anthropological Institute of Great Britain and Ireland, Vol. 43, (Jan.–Jun., 1913), pp. 109–118, 
Village of the Conquerors, Sawana: a Tongan Village in Fiji, By Alexander Philip Lessin, Phyllis June Lessin - 1970
Qaravi Na i Tavi, They did their duty, Soldiers of the great War By Christine Liava'a, Page 77, Reference Ratu Keni Naulumatua serving in World War 1 and in France. 

7-2b

Ai Vola Ni Kawa Bula, Yavusa Buca, Tokatoka No.7 – Valelevu, Koro: Lomaloma, Tikina:Lomaloma, Yasana: Lau, Native Lands and Fisheries Commission – records as of July 19, 2005
Tukutuku Raraba – History of Bau – Chapter 1 Page 1, National Archives Fiji,Reference to Bucaira and Vunibuca installing a successor the chiefly descendents are just referred to now as Buca,  The Pacific Way – A Memoir – Ratu Sir Kamisese Mara – university of Hawaii press Honolulu, reference to ‘Tukutuku Raraba’ as ‘registrar of land owners rights and customs’

7-4

References for Mere Tuisalalo Newspaper ArticleTitle: Fiji Born Actor dies Content: Talks in reference to Manu Tupou the Hollywood actor, of his ties with Sawana with reference to Ratu Mara and Adi Mere and Ratu Dreunimisimisi, Fiji Times Saturday June 12, 2004, Fiji Times Archives.
Reference to Ratu Edward and Laisa and Viliame Fonolahi.
The Pacific Way: A Memoir, Chapter 10 Page 91, By Kamisese Mara, Ratu Sir Kamisese Mara, Pacific Islands Development Program (East-West Centre), Reference to Tui Lau title as of Tongan origin from the Time of Ma’ afu when Tui Cakau gave rights to Ma’afu also recommendations for this title is from the Tongan community from Sawana Village in Vanuabalavu
20th Century Fiji, edited by Stewart Firth & Daryl Tarte - 2001 - , references to Ratu Edward and Ratu Mara and their Matrinlineal ties.

Matrilineal importance in Fijian History

Matanitu the struggle for power in early Fiji by David Routledge 1985 – published by the Institute of Pacific studies and the University of the South Pacific Fiji, Chapter 1 page 36 Why this union was important was due to the Vasu connection that brought different tribes together following are examples documenting the Importance of the Vasu connection or maternal lineage in Fiji
Fiji and the Fijians, Chapter 2 Page 33, 34 Tui Viti / Vasu 34, 35, By Thomas Williams, James Calvert

Translations and transliterations

A Fijian and English and an English and Fijian Dictionary, By David Hazlewood, James Calvert, Published 1872, republished 1979, S. Low, Marston, 281 pages, Original from the New York Public Library, Digitized Sep 27, 2006
A New Fijian Dictionary, by Arthur Capell - 1968, *Languages of Fiji - Page 63, by Albert J. Schütz - 1972 - 132 pages, Published 1972, Clarendon Press, 132 pages, 
Say it in Fijian, An Entertaining Introduction to the Language of Fiji, by Albert James Schütz – 1972
Lonely Planet Fijian Phrasebook, by Paul Geraghty - 1994 - 182 pages
Spoken Fijian: An Intensive Course in Bauan Fijian, with Grammatical Notes and Glossary By Rusiate T. Komaitai, Albert J. Schütz, Contributor Rusiate T Komaitai, Published 1971, Univ of Hawaii Pr, Foreign Language / Dictionaries / Phrase Books, 

Oral History

Articles, papers and lectures showing a general view from historians on oral history and oral tradition.
Archives, oral history and oral tradition, William W. Moss and Peter Mazikana, Part of a paper this chapter discusses the importance and processes of oral tradition and Oral history in general United Nations Educational, Scientific and Cultural Organization
The Challenge of Oral History - By Jorma Kalela:....It is in this perspective that it pays to take oral history seriously.HISTORY AND MEMORY, Turku, October 9–11, 1997, University of Turku, Lecture Hall 9, The Department of History and the Department of Political History at the University of Turku, Finland
State University of New York at Binghamton, Department of History - Oral History: Revealing the Mind through conversation – By Ute Ferrier
Oral Tradition for the Rasau and Yavusa Buca is collected from Turaga i Taukei of Yavusa Buca Ratu Keni Naulumatua, a tribes history is preserved through its elders and through its senior chief. also contributions and clarification from Ratu Tanoa Senibua and Ratu Ivan Keni both senior members of the Tokatoka Valelevu and candidates themselves for the title of Rasau. information recorded in May 2005 in Suva, Fiji.

Contributors

drawing on the work of the late Ratu Viliame Fonolahi Keni Naulumatua (Rasau) and Ratu Tevita Toganivalu (Masau) - 2007, Reference to Deve Toganivalu as reference source to Pre Christian customs of Bau, the research of Ratu David Toganivalu as Masau who along with his family and ancestors officially recorded Bauan Pre History Ratu David Toganivalu and Ratu Viliame were senior men in the Ministry of Fijian affairs in the 80's the following books have reference to them:
Common worlds and single Lives: constituting Knowledge in Pacific societies - Chapter 4 Page 95 - 103, By Verna Keck
Broken waves: A history of the Fiji Islands in the Twentieth Century – Pages 235, By Brij. V.Lal, Reference here to both Ratu Viliame Fonolahi and Ratu David Toganivalu as key men in the Fijian administration
Failure of Democratic Politics in Fiji – Page 242, By Stephnie Lawson
Fiji's Heritage a history of Fiji by Kim Gravelle reprinted under its new name in 2000 it was originally published as Fiji Times a history of Fiji in 1979.	 Published by Tiara enterprises Nadi, Part 10 Page 44 – reference to Paper by Deve Toganivalu documenting Bauan pre-history and the superiority of the Roko Tui Bau as supreme Chief of Bau and the Vunivalu as his second.
The Pacific Way – A Memoir – Ratu Sir Kamisese Mara – university of Hawaii press Honolulu. Reference to Ratu David Toganivalu page 122.

Lau Islands
Fijian nobility